Gbahi Gwladys Sakoa (born 3 December 1992) is an Ivorian fencer. She competed in the women's épée event at the 2016 Summer Olympics.

References

External links
 

1992 births
Living people
Ivorian female épée fencers
Olympic fencers of Ivory Coast
Fencers at the 2016 Summer Olympics
Place of birth missing (living people)